Flowering plum is a common name for several species in the plum genus (Prunus) cultivated for their flowers, and may refer to:

Prunus cerasifera, native to Europe
Prunus mume, native to eastern Asia
Prunus triloba, native to eastern Asia